The discography of Animal Collective, an American experimental pop group, consists of 11 studio albums, 4 live albums, 2 video albums ("visual album"), 12 extended plays and 19 singles.

The group consists of musicians Avey Tare (David Portner), Panda Bear (Noah Lennox), Deakin (Josh Dibb), and Geologist (Brian Weitz). They run the record label Paw Tracks, on which they have released much of their own material.

Albums

Studio albums

Live albums

Video albums

Soundtrack albums

Extended plays

Singles

Notes

A   Despite being extended plays as opposed to singles, People and Water Curses charted on Billboard singles charts, rather than albums charts.
B  Transverse Temporal Gyrus is a record featuring music created individually by all four members of the band and made into a sound collage in two parts. It was released as a part of Record Store Day and was limited to 5,000 copies.

References

External links
 Official website
 
 
 

Discographies of American artists
Rock music group discographies
Discography